The Ashkelon Sport Arena is an indoor sporting arena located in Ashkelon, Israel. The arena opened in 1999 and is home to the Ironi Ashkelon Basketball Club and Hapoel Ashkelon fencing and rhythmic gymnastics teams.

The arena has a capacity of 3,000 permanent seats.

Sports venues in Ashkelon
Indoor arenas in Israel
Basketball venues in Israel
Sports venues completed in 1999
1999 establishments in Israel